The Order of Ante Starčević is a Croatian national decoration which ranks twelfth in importance. The order was formed on 10 March 1995.

The Order of Ante Starčević is granted to Croatians and foreigners for their contributions to the development of the Croatian state. It is named after Ante Starčević.

Notable recipients
 Mate Boban
 Dalibor Brozović
 Bruno Bušić
 Ljubo Ćesić Rojs
 Šime Đodan
 Žarko Domljan
 Branimir Glavaš
 Ante Gotovina
 Hartmut Koschyk
 Ivan Lacković Croata
 Josip Lucić
 Ivić Pašalić
 Hrvoje Šarinić
 Christian Schmidt (awarded July 2013; received in person by Andrej Plenkovic in January 2020)
 Vladimir Šeks
 Gojko Šušak
 Franjo Tuđman
 Nikica Valentić
 Ivan Vekić
 Vice Vukojević
 Muhamed Zulić

Sources
 Law on Orders, Decorations and Signs of Recognitions of the Republic of Croatia ("Narodne novine", No. 20/95., 57/06. and 141/06.) - articles 6 and 16
 Statute on the Order of Ante Starčević ("Narodne novine", No. 108/00. from November 3, 2000).

References

Orders, decorations, and medals of Croatia
Awards established in 1995
1995 establishments in Croatia